Aldearrodrigo is a village and municipality in the province of Salamanca,  western Spain, part of the autonomous community of Castile-Leon.

References

Municipalities in the Province of Salamanca